HMS Pandora was a   of the Royal Navy. There were eleven "Third class" protected cruisers in the class, which was designed by Sir William White. While well armed for their size, they were  primarily workhorses for the overseas fleet on "police" duties and did not serve with the main battlefleet.

Construction details
They displaced 2,135 tons, had a crew complement of 224 men and were armed with eight QF 4 inch (102 mm) (25 pounder) guns, eight 3 pounder guns, three machine guns, and two 18 inch (457 mm) torpedo tubes.

Service history

HMS Pandora was laid down at Portsmouth Dockyard on 3 January 1898, and launched on 17 January 1900, when she was christened by Mrs. (Mary Elizabeth) Napier, daughter of Admiral Sir Michael Culme-Seymour, Commander-in-Chief at Portsmouth (and herself wife of a Royal Navy officer who later became Vice-Admiral Sir Trevylyan Napier).

She was commissioned for the 1901 naval maneuvers, then carried out a series of propeller trials at Portsmouth under Commander Somerset Gough-Calthorpe, before she was paid off on 13 September 1901. On 7 November 1901 she was commissioned by Commander John Francis Murray-Aynsley to relieve  on the Mediterranean Station, and she arrived at Malta early the following month. In June 1902 she visited Cyprus, and in September that year she was in the Aegean Sea visiting Nauplia.

In 1906, her Commander was William Sullivan, second son of Admiral Sir Francis Sullivan, 6th Baronet.

Pandora was sold for scrap in July 1913.

References

 World War I Naval Combat webpage  
 Miramar Ship Index listing

 

Pelorus-class cruisers of the Royal Navy
Ships built in Portsmouth
1900 ships